Vyskočil (feminine: Vyskočilová) is a Czech surname. Notable people with the surname include:
 František Vyskočil (born 1941), Czech neuroscientist
 Ivan Vyskočil (born 1946), Czech actor
 Martin Vyskočil (born 1982), Czech footballer
 Mary Kay Vyskocil (born 1958), United States District Judge
 Pavel Vyskočil (1882–1970), Czech opera singer
 Rudolf Wiskoczil (1870–1925), Austrian architect

See also
 

Czech-language surnames